Vayavilan Central College ( Vayavilan Central College) is a provincial school in Vayavilan near Vasavilan, Sri Lanka.

See also
 List of schools in Northern Province, Sri Lanka

References

Educational institutions established in 1946
Provincial schools in Sri Lanka
Schools in Jaffna District
1946 establishments in Ceylon